Aurica is a possible future supercontinent configuration. It is one of the four proposed supercontinents that are speculated to form within 200 million years, the others being Pangaea Proxima, Amasia and Novopangaea. The Aurica hypothesis was created by scholars at the Geological Magazine following an American Geophysical Union study linking the strength of ocean tides to the supercontinent cycle. The study noted that "When tectonic plates slide, sink and shift the Earth’s continents to form large landmasses, or supercontinents, ocean basins open and close in tandem. As these basins change shape, they can strike forms that amplify and intensify their tides."

Formation 
According to the Aurica hypothesis, both the Atlantic and Pacific Oceans will close, and a new ocean will replace them both. Duarte and colleagues hypothesize that a new rift will develop in central Eurasia, cutting from India to the Arctic, which will split Eurasia in two and create a new ocean. 

The current northward motion of Australia and Antarctica will see them collide with eastern Eurasia and the Americas to close the Pacific, while western Eurasia and Africa collide with the Americas on the other side to close the Atlantic.

Alternative scenarios 
Paleogeologist Ronald Blakey has described the next 15 to 85 million years of tectonic development as fairly settled and predictable, without supercontinent formation. Beyond that, he cautions that the geologic record is full of unexpected shifts in tectonic activity that make further projections "very, very speculative". Three hypothetical supercontinents—"Amasia", Christopher Scotese's "Pangaea Proxima", and Roy Livermore's "Novopangaea"—were illustrated in an October 2007 New Scientist article.

References

External links
 Four possible future supercontinents

Future supercontinents